"Santo Santo" is the first single song by Só Pra Contrariar from the album Juegos de Amor, recorded as a duet with international pop star Gloria Estefan. The tune has its origins in Raffaella Carra's greatest hit "Tanti Auguri" from the 1970s.

Song history
The song is sung in the form of a prayer asking to a love saint to help both (Estefan and Pires), to find their true love. The song has been recorded in two languages, Spanish and Portuguese.

At the Latin Grammy Awards of 2000 this single received a nomination for Best Pop Vocal Performance by a Duo or Group, which was awarded to "Se Me Olvido Otra Vez" by Maná.

Charts

References

1999 singles
Gloria Estefan songs
Spanish-language songs
Male–female vocal duets
1999 songs
Epic Records singles
Songs written by Emilio Estefan